Agriterra Limited is an agricultural investment company based in Guernsey with operations in Mozambique. The company is split into two divisions; beef, which sources and processes cattle from local farms and Grain, which purchases and processes maize.

The company is listed on the Alternative Investment Market in London.

References

External links

Companies of Guernsey
Companies listed on the London Stock Exchange